Rob Varley was appointed chief executive of the Met Office in 2014. He stepped down in 2018. Rob was First Vice President of the World Meteorological Organization until 24 April 2018.

He was educated at Cheltenham Bournside School and graduated from the University of East Anglia with a BSc in Environmental Sciences in 1983. Varley was the first CEO to be promoted from within the Met Office since its founding in 1854. He holds a postgraduate diploma in Management from the University of Reading (2001) and a diploma in Company Direction from the Institute of Directors (2010). He received an Honorary Doctorate of Science from the University of East Anglia in 2016. He is a Chartered Meteorologist of the Royal Meteorological Society  and Chartered Director of the Institute of Directors. In 2012 he was named as the Institute of Directors' Director of the Year (Public and Third Sectors).

Rob was Vice President of the Royal Meteorological Society from 2013 to 2014, President of EUMETNET from 2015 to 2018  and First Vice President of the World Meteorological Organisation from 2017 to 2018.

References

Year of birth missing (living people)
Living people
Alumni of the University of East Anglia
British meteorologists
Met Office
World Meteorological Organization people